is a puzzle video game developed by Game Freak and published by Nintendo for the Super Famicom. It was released exclusively in Japan in 1993. Mario & Wario requires the Super Famicom Mouse accessory to play. Despite being a Japan-only release, the game is entirely in English.

The gameplay of Mario & Wario focuses on guiding Mario, who has various objects placed atop his head by his nemesis Wario, through a series of levels consisting of various obstacles and traps. Because Mario has been rendered sightless and is constantly in danger of walking into hazards, the player controls the fairy Wanda, who can protect Mario by changing the environment around him as he moves towards the levels' end. The game offers a total of 100 levels and offers three playable characters.

Gameplay

Mario & Wario focuses on Mario, who has various objects, including buckets and vases, placed atop his head by the antagonist Wario. Because the objects render Mario sightless, it is the main goal of the player to guide Mario through each level, which consist of various obstacles and traps, to his brother Luigi, who can remove the offending object. The player must also complete each level within a specified time limit. Because Mario will constantly walk left or right regardless of any oncoming hazards, the player controls the fairy Wanda, who possesses the ability to manipulate the environment in order to protect Mario.

Wanda is controlled via a point-and-click interface with the Super Famicom Mouse accessory, influencing objects on the screen when clicked. For example, Wanda can solidify block outlines for use as barriers or bridges for Mario to walk across, and can destroy certain obstacles and enemies. The player can also click Mario to turn him around and reverse his direction. The player is awarded points for defeating enemies, collecting items, and for any remaining time when the level is completed. Extra lives may also be awarded.

Mario & Wario contains a total of 100 levels allotted amongst ten unique locales, which include forest, desert, and underwater settings, each with a different offering of enemies or hazards. In addition to Mario, the player can select Princess Peach or Yoshi to be the character that is guided through each level. Princess Peach walks slower than Mario and Yoshi walks faster, which may offer advantages or disadvantages depending on how difficult a particular level is or how fast the player seeks to complete it.

Development 
Mario & Wario was designed by Pokémon creator Satoshi Tajiri and developed by Game Freak. The developer's co-founder Junichi Masuda was the game's music composer and one of its programmers. According to Masuda, an early version of the game involved catching monsters by shooting out a net using the Super Scope. However, the team had difficulty getting the peripheral to recognize the tops and bottoms of television screens, most of which were generally small at the time. Control was then switched to the Super Famicom Mouse.

Reception and legacy

Jon Thompson of Allgame praised the colorful graphics and calling the gameplay "entertaining, being fast-paced enough to keep you constantly busy, without resorting to being fast and nearly impossible more than a couple of times."

While the game is Japan-exclusive, Mario & Wario was referenced in other Nintendo games released outside the region. The Game Boy role-playing game Pokémon Red and Blue, also developed by Game Freak, alludes to the game: checking the Super NES belonging to a non-playable character displays the message "A game with MARIO wearing a bucket on his head!" This reference returns in Pokémon FireRed and LeafGreen. The bucket used to obscure Mario's vision is collectible both as an item in Kirby Super Star and as a trophy in Super Smash Bros. Melee.

Notes

References

External links

Mario and Wario on Nintendo's official site 

1993 video games
Game Freak games
Japan-exclusive video games
Mario puzzle games
Super Nintendo Entertainment System games
Super Nintendo Entertainment System-only games
Wario video games
Video games developed in Japan
Video games featuring female protagonists
Single-player video games
Video games scored by Junichi Masuda